Siriroj Football Club (Thai สิริโรจน์ เอฟซี), is a Thai football club based in Chonburi, Thailand. The club is currently playing in the Thai Football Division 3.

Record

References

External links
 

Association football clubs established in 2014
Football clubs in Thailand
Sport in Chonburi province
2014 establishments in Thailand